Dadin-e Olya (also Romanized as Dādīn-e ‘Olyā; also known as Dādīn-e Bālā) is a village in Dadin Rural District, Jereh and Baladeh District, Kazerun County, Fars Province, Iran. At the 2006 census, its population was 1,109, in 207 families.

References 

Populated places in Kazerun County